Karla may refer to:

People 
 Karla (name), a feminine given name
 Petras Karla (1937–1969), Soviet Olympic rower

Places 
 Karla, Kose Parish, a village in Harju County, Estonia
 Karla, Rae Parish, a village in Harju County, Estonia
 Kärla, a village in Saaremaa County, Estonia
 Karla, Greece
 Karla, Mawal, a village in Pune district, Maharashtra, India
 Karla, Ratnagiri, a village in Ratnagiri, Maharashtra, India
 Karli, India, a town in Maharashtra, India, site of the Karla Caves
 Karla crater, a meteorite impact crater in Russia
 (181708) 1993 FW, a trans-Neptunian object, the second discovered, for which Karla was an early proposed name

Fiction 
 Karla (character), the Soviet spymaster who serves as an overarching antagonist in the works of John le Carré
 The Karla trilogy, three of le Carré's George Smiley novels focusing on Karla
 Karla (film), a 2006 film by Joel Bender

See also 
 Carla (disambiguation)